Mark "Vinnie" Dombroski (born December 4, 1962) is an American musician, best known as the lead vocalist and main songwriter for the American rock band Sponge. He also fronted the short-lived supergroup Spys4Darwin, and has been a member of several Detroit-based bands throughout his career.

Dombroski is also the lead vocalist and co-founder of The Lucid alongside bassist David Ellefson (ex Megadeth), guitarist Drew Fortier (ex Bang Tango), and drummer Mike Heller (Fear Factory, Raven).

Early life
Vinnie Dombroski was born on December 4, 1962 in Detroit, Michigan. He began playing the guitar and drums at an early age, and when he was 13-years-old he performed locally in Detroit with his friend Lee in a two-piece band called The Cryptons.

Career
Dombroski began his music career as a drummer with the bands Warp Drive and Loudhouse before finding mainstream success as the lead vocalist of Sponge. In addition to Sponge, he is also the frontman of Crud, The Orbitsuns, Diamondbuck, and The Lucid. Sponge released their ninth studio album, Lavatorium, on August 6, 2021.

Musical style and influences
AllMusic described Sponge's sound as being a "versatile blend of classic hard rock and punchy alt-pop with a thin metal veneer". Some of the musical influences that Dombroski has cited include the MC5, The Stooges, Iggy Pop, David Bowie, The Velvet Underground, Alice Cooper, Bob Seger, Aerosmith, The Beatles, The Rolling Stones, the Sex Pistols, The Clash, Fear, The Psychedelic Furs, and Hank Williams. In concert he has also performed songs by Danny Davis and the Nashville Brass, the Ramones, Lou Reed, AC/DC, and Pink Floyd.

Discography

Sponge

The Orbitsuns

 The Orbitsuns (2002)
 Dollars and Dice (2006)
 Redneck Disco Revisited (2008)
 First Drink of the Day (2010)
 Give The Orbitsuns What They Want (2012)
 Xs Over Our Eyes (2015)

Crud

 Devil at the Wheel (2005)
 Crud on Monster Island (2010)

Diamondbuck

 South Detroit Honky Tonks and Other UFOs (2018)
 The House of Weird Smells (2021)

The Lucid

 The Lucid (2021)
 Saddle Up and Ride (2023)

Lalar V, The Orbitsuns, and Jennifer Westwood

 Lalar V (2016)

The Sons of Perdition

 Long Walk With the Devil (2008)

Spys4Darwin

 Microfish (2001)

Maypops

 Spirits of Agnew (2000)

Sharecroppers of Soul

 Sharecroppers of Soul (1996)

Loudhouse

 For Crying Out Loud (1991)

Warp Drive

 Gimme Gimme (1988)

Plain Vu

Singles

 "An Angel Drank My Whiskey" (2010)
 "The Leaving" (2010)

References

External links
 
 Static Magazine Interview with Vinnie Dombroski

1962 births
20th-century American singers
21st-century American singers
Alternative rock singers
American alternative rock musicians
American male singer-songwriters
American rock songwriters
Living people
Singers from Detroit
20th-century American male singers
21st-century American male singers
Spys4Darwin members
Singer-songwriters from Michigan